Leonardo Ataíde de Oliveira Siqueira (born 19 January 2004) is a Brazilian professional footballer who plays as an right-back for Athletico Paranaense.

Career statistics

Club

References

2004 births
Living people
People from Piracicaba
Footballers from São Paulo (state)
Brazilian footballers
Brazil youth international footballers
Association football forwards
Club Athletico Paranaense players